Xavier's Security Enforcers (also known as the XSE) are a fictional superhero team/police force appearing in American comic books published by Marvel Comics. The characters are depicted as being from the fictional 2070s, a time ruled by mutant hunting/killing robots called Sentinels, who at this point in time had run amok, essentially ruling Earth in order to carry out their objective to protect humanity. The XSE is formed in the fallout of the Gene War (a conflict first mentioned in X-Treme X-Men #4) and the Summers Rebellion, during which mutants and humans join forces to defeat the Sentinels.

Publication history

The team was featured in the eponymous 1996 limited series XSE, which was followed by the 1998 mini-series Bishop: XSE.

Fictional team history
The XSE is a team of mutants dedicated to bringing criminal mutants to justice. Initially called the Xavier's School Enforcers, the team was named after Professor Charles Xavier because the members of the XSE believe in his ideals. The team was apparently founded by the mutant Forge, in this era known as Genesis.

Notable members of the team's original roster include Archer, Bishop, Trevor Fitzroy, Fixx, Greystone, Malcolm, Randall, and Bishop's younger sibling Shard. In the XSE, Bishop led Randall and Malcolm, and the three men were known as the Omega Squad. Shard was also a member of the Omega Squad until her promotion to Lieutenant. Bishop had turned down several promotions in order to stay with his team, leading to her outranking him. She was later killed in the line of duty.

Fitzroy dropped out of the XSE and turned against them. Years later, he opened a portal through time before traveling to Earth-616, the present setting of the X-Men universe, with a group of mutant criminals. This led the Omega Squad to follow them to the same timeline, where they encountered the X-Men. Due to the time-traveling abilities of Fitzroy, Bishop and a holographic version of Shard then stayed in the present, and Malcolm and Randall were killed. Bishop became a member of Storm's Gold Team when the X-Men split their large team roster into a Blue and a Gold Team. Shard, once carried on a holographic projector by Bishop, regained sentience due to a computer virus and previous tinkering of Forge. Shard eventually became a member of the government-funded X-Factor team.

Disgruntled by XSE tactics and the world they lived in, Archer, Fixx, and Greystone became members of a splinter team of "rogues" called the X.U.E. (Xavier's Underground Enforcers). They wished to travel back in time to prevent their era from happening. Shard also joined their ranks for a brief period. It is quite possible that the X.U.E.'s creator is none other than the mutant inventor Forge.

While a member of the X.U.E., Shard was permanently linked to Fixx, a mutant with psionic abilities. This mental link allowed for the spirits of the X.U.E. (who are all linked to each other in like fashion) to enter present-day Earth in order to complete their mission from the future.

Bishop later became part of a team of X-Men known briefly as the X-Treme Sanctions Executive. He developed misgivings about his role in the present because he did not want to accidentally help create a version of the future he preferred to prevent. However, that notion fell away, along with the XSE's government-sanctioned role, after M-Day.

References

External links
 Xavier's Security Enforcers at the Marvel Universe
 Xavier's Security Enforcers at Comic Vine
 XSE at Mutant High
 
 
 

1996 comics debuts
Marvel Comics mutants
Marvel Comics superhero teams
Fictional organizations in Marvel Comics
Marvel Comics limited series
X-Men
X-Men supporting characters